Terrax the Tamer is a character appearing in American comic books published by Marvel Comics. Created by artist John Byrne and writer Marv Wolfman, the character first appeared in October 1979, and is a herald of cosmic entity Galactus and enemy of the Fantastic Four.

The character has made several appearances in media, including several animated television shows, video games and was included in the Marvel Legends and Minimate toylines.

Publication history

The character first appears in Fantastic Four #211 (Oct. 1979) and was created by Marv Wolfman and John Byrne.

Fictional character biography

The Birth of a Herald
The character first appears as a Birjan named Tyros, the ruler of the city-state of Lanlak on the planetoid Birj. The cosmic entity Galactus selects Tyros as his next Herald, but first wishes for the superhero team the Fantastic Four to humble him. In return the cosmic entity agrees to travel to Earth to aid the heroes against a new threat, the villain Sphinx. Tyros is defeated, and brought before Galactus, who changes the petty tyrant into Terrax the Tamer. His minor control over stone was augmented to an incalculable degree. Now, he could affect all matter of rock and stone on nearly a planetary scale. His body was changed so that it would withstand the vacuum of space. Finally, Galactus gave Terrax a weapon called the cosmic axe capable of generating waves of cosmic force. Terrax travels with Galactus to Earth and, while his new master battles the Sphinx, attacks the Fantastic Four—still resenting the heroes for their role in his transformation. Terrax, however, is tricked and defeated by the Human Torch, and leaves with a victorious Galactus.

Rebellion
As Galactus's new herald, Terrax found more worlds for his master than any of the previous heralds. Terrax likened the discovery of new planets to the feeling of conquest. On several occasions, Terrax annihilated large segments of the population himself using his cosmic powers. As Galactus had hoped, Terrax's lack of morality made him a successful herald. But whereas Galactus's other heralds had a sense of loyalty to their master, Terrax had none. Indeed, he served Galactus out of fear for his master's power, but even conquered that fear on several occasions to defy Galactus' wishes. Shortly after being transformed into Galactus' herald, Terrax fled from his master and overthrew the ruling body of a small-unnamed planet. He enslaved the entire population and set himself up as the planet's deity. Huge segments of that world's people died erecting temples and cities to glorify Terrax. Terrax planned to use the survivors of his reign as the first wave of a planned universe conquering army. But before Terrax could proceed any further, Galactus summoned his herald. Fearful of his master's wrath, Terrax hid in a black hole. Utilizing the powers of the Earth mutant Dazzler, Galactus freed Terrax and made him obedient to his will again.

Terrax reappears in the title Rom, and after leading Galactus to the planet Galador, battles its champion, Rom, and his fellow Spaceknight, Terminator.

But Terrax's rebellious nature could not be totally stifled, and after a while, Terrax again fled his master. This time, he went to Earth. Utilizing his power, Terrax levitated the entire island of Manhattan into earth orbit and used the lives of its millions of inhabitants to bargain with the Fantastic Four. To spare Manhattan, Terrax demanded that they destroy Galactus by attacking his ship. Galactus had by now realized that his herald had become a liability to him, Returning Manhattan to Earth, Galactus stripped Terrax of his cosmic power and the transformed alien was sent hurtling from the top of the World Trade Center down to the street below. Although seriously injured, Terrax's alien physique enabled him to survive the fall. An unidentified passerby took Terrax's broken form, unknown to both the Fantastic Four and the Avengers, who were present at the site, to a nearby hospital. He remained there for several months in a semi comatose state.

Victor Von Doom, looking for a pawn to use in a plot against the Fantastic Four, discovered that Terrax had survived. Terrax was kidnapped from the hospital and brought back to Doom's kingdom of Latveria by a squad of robots dispatched by Doom. There, after six weeks of Doom's advanced treatments, Terrax recovered. But, having been stripped of cosmic power, Terrax had no memories of having been the herald of Galactus, and thus called himself Tyros once more. Doom had recently perfected a device that was capable of endowing an individual with limited cosmic power. Tyros readily agreed to be exposed to the device's energies, as he wished revenge against the Fantastic Four. Garbed in a special suit that would channel and regulate the cosmic energies in his body, Tyros set off for New York. Unknown to him, the power Doom gave him would consume Tyros's body within a matter of hours. Thus, Doom would not be faced with an adversary whose power was vaster than his own, once Tyros had served his purpose.

Tyros defeated the Fantastic Four at a shopping mall and, detesting the fact he was in the service of any master, he turned on Doom and immobilized the Latverian monarch in his armor. At Tyros's moment of seeming triumph, the Silver Surfer, the first of Galactus's heralds, arrived to save the lives of his friends. Tyros believed that his power level was equal to that of the Surfer's, but he soon learned that he was no match for someone who had received the Power Cosmic from Galactus himself. Tyros was forced to use his powers to their limit to combat the Surfer. This only served to hasten his inevitable deterioration. As the two former heralds of Galactus engaged in battle, Tyros was totally consumed by the Power Cosmic. When Tyros and Silver Surfer crash to the ground, they land on and obliterate the helpless Doctor Doom. Suddenly a shopper speaks arrogantly to an elderly woman, who turns out to be Spider-Man's Aunt May. Doctor Doom had, unknown to anybody, transferred his mind into the body of a shopper while leaving the shopper to die in Doctor Doom's body. It is left to the Beyonder to undo this confusing chain of events.

In an Avengers annual Terrax is temporarily resurrected to become a member of the second Legion of the Unliving by the Elder of the Universe the Grandmaster.

Tyros reforms his physical form as Terrax in the title New Warriors, and battles the fledgling superhero team. Terrax is defeated when the heroes, deducing that his form is unstable and that constant contact with earth is required, separate him and thereby his form. Terrax reappears when reformed once again by a rogue scientist attempting to steal his power. He uses the scientist as a host body and again battles the New Warriors and Fantastic Four. The Silver Surfer intervenes and maroons Terrax on the deserted planet Pluraris IV.

Terrax features in the third volume of the Silver Surfer when asked to join his fellow Heralds against the threat of Galactus' latest Herald, Morg. After Morg's defeat, Terrax claims the character's axe. Morg eventually wishes to retrieve his weapon and battles Terrax until both are briefly captured—together with several other extraterrestrial characters Gladiator and Beta Ray Bill—by the entity Tyrant. Terrax guest stars in the limited series Cosmic Powers, in which Tyrant is confronted and thwarted by the Titan Thanos.

After a battle with fellow Heralds the Surfer and Nova (actually the demon Mephisto in disguise) in the title Silver Surfer, the character goes into hiding until he featured in the second Sentry limited series. During the GLX-Mas Special, Terrax is confronted and defeated by Squirrel Girl. Terrax appears in the Annihilation storyline, being initially captured by the forces of Annihilus before escaping with the Alien Skrull Paibok. Terrax later finds a world ruled by the Space Parasite, whom he eventually kills. On discovering that the inhabitants are content to live in subservience, he flies into a rage and destroys the planet.

In the title Hulk, Terrax is plucked from continuity by the Elder of the Universe the Grandmaster to be part of a team called the Offenders in a bid to thwart the Hulk.

Death
Terrax later returns to his birth planet Birj where he's approached by one member of the Nova Corps, who had come to give a warning to Terrax and is helping in the evacuation of the planet. Terrax briefly fights him and refuses to evacuate the planet. Nova runs away as the threat he warned Terrax about arrives. As Nova leaves the planet, he sees the Phoenix Force completely consuming the planet Birj on its way through the universe, taking Terrax and all its population with it.

Resurrection
While he was killed by the Phoenix Force, Tyros was eventually resurrected at some point and was found by Drax the Destroyer when the later crash landed on an unnamed planet. The events that led to his resurrection are unknown even for Tyros, but he suspects that the Phoenix's energy that killed him also might have restored him back to life. He later acquired a Phoenix Egg, under unknown circumstances, and stored it on his warship. Thane eventually learned about this, and deceived his allies (the Champion, Starfox and Nebula) into helping him invade Terrax's warship to steal the egg.

Terrax later lands in San Francisco, California, where he battles the Superior Spider-Man. During the battle, Terrax nearly kills Superior Spider-Man, until the Night Shift shows up and drops a device which Spider-Man uses to absorb some of his cosmic powers. Despite being slightly depowered, Terrax still proves to be a match for Spider-Man but is eventually defeated.

Powers and abilities
Tyros is an alien with a genetic mutation that gives him the limited psionic ability to manipulate rock and earth molecules. After being transformed by Galactus's Power Cosmic, he can perform near-limitless feats, such as moving asteroids, meteors, and even whole planets from space at high speeds, affect tectonic plates to cause earthquakes and create chasms, or levitate large landmasses miles into the air. Like all Heralds, Terrax has immense strength, stamina, durability, speed, agility, reflexes, and lifespan, as well as hypersonic flight, energy control, and sustained metabolism. He wielded a cosmic axe, which it had several powers of its own.

Other versions

MC2
A future version of Terrax appears in alternate universe the MC2 title, Fantastic Five.

Terrax the Truly Enlightened
In "Earth-TRN267," Terrax was also a herald of Galaktus and called himself "Terrax the Truly Enlightened". When this Earth started to collide with Earth-616 due to an Incursion, the Illuminati traveled to that reality to see if they could save the people there before destroying the world. They found that Terrax had already guided Galaktus of that universe to destroy it to save his universe. Terrax demanded the Illuminati retreat to their home reality, but they refused, and Terrax attacked them. Terrax was eventually defeated and captured but not in time to stop Galactus, who consumed the Earth-TRN267, averting in the process the Earth-616's destruction.

Terrax was taken to Earth-616 and was imprisoned in the Necropolis of Wakanda in a cell next to Black Swan's, where she later suggested that he would soon have an interest in teaming up with her. Terrax joins the New Cabal to destroy Earths that are colliding with Earth-616.

In other media

Television
 Terrax appeared in the Fantastic Four TV series, voiced by Tony Jay in season one and Ron Feinberg in season two. In the episode "Silver Surfer and the Coming of Galactus" Pt. 2, Galactus summons Terrax and Firelord to hold off three of the Fantastic Four while he assembles his machine that will enable him to consume Earth. Terrax fought Thing in battle. Once Galactus finished assembling the device, he sent Terrax and Firelord away. In the episode "To Battle the Living Planet", Terrax was seen with Galactus when the Fantastic Four arrive to beg Galactus to help them defeat Ego the Living Planet. In the episode "When Calls Galactus", Terrax tricks Galactus into consuming a poisonous planet and then tries to manipulate the Fantastic Four into finishing off Galactus while in his sick and vulnerable state. The Fantastic Four ultimately choose to help Galactus instead and defeat Terrax. As punishment for Terrax's treachery, Galactus transforms him into a colony of earthworms, which he banishes to Earth.
 Terrax appears in The Super Hero Squad Show episode "Last Exit Before Doomsday!", voiced by Ted Biaselli.
 Terrax appears in The Avengers: Earth's Mightiest Heroes, voiced by Kevin Grevioux. In the episode "Avengers Assemble!", he is seen as one of the Heralds of Galactus and is depicted as an Earth construct rather than an actual alien. Terrax was the first of the Heralds of Galactus to arrive and single-handedly took down the Avengers. The Avengers called in their allies to help fight the Heralds of Galactus as Captain America leads Iron Fist, Quake, Spider-Man, and War Machine to fight Terrax. He is destroyed by Iron Fist and Captain America.
 Terrax appears in the Disney XD Marvel series, voiced by James C. Mathis III. 
 Terrax appears in Hulk and the Agents of S.M.A.S.H.. In the episode "Galactus Goes Green", he appears on Earth, preparing it for Galactus' consumption at the time when the Agents of S.M.A.S.H. are in Las Vegas. After Terrax is defeated by She-Hulk, Galactus takes away Terrax's Power Cosmic and bestows it upon She-Hulk transforming her into the Emerald Emissary. During the Agents of S.M.A.S.H.'s fight with Galactus, She-Hulk later sought out Terrax and battled him to make a deal with him. When Terrax and She-Hulk's battle brings it near Galactus, She-Hulk is defeated by Terrax causing Galactus to reinstate him after returning She-Hulk to normal. Unbeknownst to Galactus, She-Hulk actually took a dive during the fight. As Galactus leaves to consume another planet, the deal that She-Hulk made for Terrax was for him to have Galactus consume uninhabited planets that Terrax happens to find. In the episode "Planet Hulk" Pt. 2, Firelord mentions in his battle with the Agents of S.M.A.S.H. that Terrax has failed Galactus. It is implied by Firelord that he used his fire attack on Terrax.
 Terrax appears in the Ultimate Spider-Man episode "Contest of Champions" Pt. 3, where the Grandmaster pairs him up with Attuma and Annihilus against Collector's team of Spider-Man, Iron Spider, Agent Venom, and Thor.

Video games
 Terrax appears as a boss in the Game Boy Advance port Fantastic 4 - Flame On.
 Terrax also appears in the game Fantastic Four: Rise of the Silver Surfer, voiced by Fred Tatasciore.

Toys
 Terrax was released as a build-a-figure in the Marvel Legends toyline in January 2012, later being rereleased in a multipack in 2023.
 A Terrax Minimate will be featured in the Toys R Us exclusive Heralds of Galactus boxset.

References

External links
 Terrax at Marvel.com

Characters created by John Byrne (comics)
Characters created by Marv Wolfman
Comics characters introduced in 1979
Fictional characters with earth or stone abilities
Fictional characters with energy-manipulation abilities
Fictional characters with slowed ageing
Fictional characters with superhuman durability or invulnerability
Fictional dictators
Fictional swordfighters in comics
Marvel Comics characters who can move at superhuman speeds
Marvel Comics characters with superhuman strength
Marvel Comics extraterrestrial supervillains
Marvel Comics mutants
Marvel Comics supervillains
Villains in animated television series